Aravindan Puraskaram (Aravindan Award) is an award instituted in 1991 in the memory of iconic Malayalam filmmaker G. Aravindan for the best debutant director in Indian languages. The award comprises Rs. 25,000, a memento and a citation. The award is facilitated by Kerala Chalachitra Film Society. The award is presented on March 15 every year on the death anniversary of Aravindan, who is considered one of the pioneers of parallel cinema in Malayalam.

Recipients

References 

Lists of Indian award winners
Indian film awards
Indian film award winners
Kerala awards
1991 establishments in Kerala
Awards established in 1991